Barajas de Melo is a municipality in Cuenca, Castile-La Mancha, Spain. It had a population of 940 .

References 

Municipalities in the Province of Cuenca